Griebelschied is an Ortsgemeinde – a municipality belonging to a Verbandsgemeinde, a kind of collective municipality – in the Birkenfeld district in Rhineland-Palatinate, Germany. It belongs to the Verbandsgemeinde Herrstein-Rhaunen, whose seat is in Herrstein.

Geography

Location
The municipality lies west of the Nahe between Kirn and Herrstein. Forty-three percent of the municipal area is wooded.

History
In 1279, Griebelschied had its first documentary mention. In 1800, Schinderhannes (Johannes Bückler), an infamous outlaw, celebrated his “Robber’s Ball of Griebelschied”.

Politics

Municipal council
The council is made up of 6 council members, who were elected by majority vote at the municipal election held on 7 June 2009, and the honorary mayor as chairman.

Mayor
Griebelschied's mayor is Markus Hey.

Coat of arms
The municipality's arms might be described thus: Per bend Or a lion rampant gules armed and langued azure, and vert an oakleaf bendwise slipped and a sprig of acorns bendwise sinister, the two per saltire in base and the whole of the first.

Culture and sightseeing

The following are listed buildings or sites in Rhineland-Palatinate’s Directory of Cultural Monuments:
 Evangelical church, Hauptstraße – essentially a late mediaeval aisleless church with ridge turret; décor from the 18th century

Economy and infrastructure

To the southeast runs Bundesstraße 41. Available in nearby Kirn is a railway station on the Nahe Valley Railway (Bingen–Saarbrücken).

References

External links
 Brief portrait of Griebelschied with film at SWR Fernsehen 
 Municipality’s official webpage 

Birkenfeld (district)